James Bryant Woode (September 23, 1926 – April 23, 2005) was an American jazz bassist. He played and/or recorded in bands with Flip Phillips, Sarah Vaughan, Ella Fitzgerald, Charlie Parker, Duke Ellington, Coleman Hawkins, Nat Pierce, Sidney Bechet, Billie Holiday, Jaki Byard, Earl Hines, Jimmy Witherspoon, Clark Terry and Miles Davis.

Biography
Woode was born September 23, 1926 in Philadelphia, Pennsylvania, United States. His father, also named Jimmy Woode, was a music teacher and pianist who had played with Hot Lips Page. Woode studied piano and bass in Boston at Boston University and at the Conservatory of Music, as well as at the Philadelphia Academy.

He joined the Duke Ellington Orchestra in 1955, appearing on many of Ellington's recordings, including  Such Sweet Thunder and Ella Fitzgerald Sings the Duke Ellington Songbook, both from 1957, as well as the performance at the 1956 Newport Jazz Festival issued on Ellington at Newport. He stayed with the Orchestra until 1960, when he left to live in Europe.

Jimmy Woode's song "Just Give Me Time" was covered by Carola in 1966, first released on her album Carola & Heikki Sarmanto Trio, reaching the Finnish charts in 2004.

An original member of The Kenny Clarke-Francy Boland Big Band, in 1995 he also toured with Lionel Hampton's Golden Men of Jazz.

In 2003, Woode formed a trio with drummer Pete York and German jazz musician/comedian Helge Schneider, touring in Germany with his interpretation of jazz classics such as "Georgia" and "Summertime". As a consequence of his co-operation with Schneider, Woode also starred in the feature film Jazzclub (2004). in the role of Steinberg, a struggling jazz bassist.

He died April 23, 2005 at age 78 at his home in Lindenwold, New Jersey, of complications following a surgery for a stomach aneurysm.

Discography

As leader
The Colorful Strings of Jimmy Woode (Argo, 1958)

As sideman
With (groups led by) Don Byas, Albert Nicholas, Bud Powell, Idrees Sulieman 
Americans in Europe (Impulse!, 1963) 
With Kenny Clarke
The Golden 8 (Blue Note, 1961) 
Jazz Is Universal (Atlantic, 1962) - with the Kenny Clarke/Francy Boland Big Band
Handle with Care (Atlantic, 1963) - with the Kenny Clarke/Francy Boland Big Band
Now Hear Our Meanin' (Columbia, 1963 [1965]) - with the Kenny Clarke/Francy Boland Big Band
Swing, Waltz, Swing (Philips, 1966) - with the Kenny Clarke/Francy Boland Big Band
Sax No End (SABA, 1967) - with the Kenny Clarke/Francy Boland Big Band
Out of the Folk Bag (Columbia, 1967) - with the Kenny Clarke/Francy Boland Big Band
17 Men and Their Music (Campi, 1967) - with the Kenny Clarke/Francy Boland Big Band
All Smiles (MPS, 1968)  - with the Kenny Clarke/Francy Boland Big Band
Faces (MPS, 1969) - with the Kenny Clarke/Francy Boland Big Band
Latin Kaleidoscope (MPS, 1968) - with the Kenny Clarke/Francy Boland Big Band
All Blues (MPS, 1969) - with the Kenny Clarke/Francy Boland Big Band
More Smiles (MPS, 1969) - with the Kenny Clarke/Francy Boland Big Band
Clarke Boland Big Band en Concert avec Europe 1 (Tréma, 1969 [1992]) - with the Kenny Clarke/Francy Boland Big Band
Off Limits (Polydor, 1970) - with the Kenny Clarke/Francy Boland Big Band
November Girl (Black Lion, 1970 [1975]) - with Carmen McRae and the Kenny Clarke/Francy Boland Big Band
With Ted Curson
Urge (Fontana, 1966)
With Eddie "Lockjaw" Davis and Johnny Griffin
Tough Tenors Again 'n' Again (MPS, 1970)
With Nathan Davis
The Hip Walk
Peace Treaty
Happy Girl
With Eric Dolphy
Stockholm Sessions (Enja, 1961)
With Duke Ellington
Blue Rose (Columbia, 1956) with Rosemary Clooney 
Blues in Orbit (Columbia, 1960)
With Art Farmer
Gentle Eyes (Mainstream, 1972)
With Erich Kleinschuster (Sextett)
Live (Preiser Records, 1973)
With Paul Gonsalves
Cookin' (Argo, 1957)
With Johnny Griffin
Night Lady (Philips, 1964)
With Jim Hall
It's Nice to Be With You (MPS, 1969)
With Johnny Hodges
Creamy (Norgran, 1955)
Ellingtonia '56 (Norgran, 1956)
Duke's in Bed (Verve, 1956)
The Big Sound (Verve, 1957)
Blues-a-Plenty (Verve, 1958)
Not So Dukish (Verve, 1958)
With John Lewis and Svend Asmussen
European Encounter (Atlantic, 1962)
With Mythologie
Live At »Domicile« Munich (BASF, 1971)
With Sahib Shihab
Summer Dawn (Argo, 1964)
Seeds (Vogue Schallplatten, 1968)
Companionship (Vogue Schallplatten, 1964-70 [1971])
Commitment (1970)
With Sunbirds
Sunbirds (BASF, 1971)
Zagara (Polydor/Finger, 1973)
With Clark Terry
Out on a Limb with Clark Terry (Argo, 1957)
With Mal Waldron
Black Glory (Enja, 1971)
Mal Waldron Plays the Blues (Enja, 1971)
A Touch of the Blues (Enja, 1972)
One-Upmanship (Enja, 1977)

References

1926 births
2005 deaths
American double-bassists
Male double-bassists
American jazz musicians
Duke Ellington Orchestra members
Musicians from Philadelphia
People from Lindenwold, New Jersey
Jazz musicians from Pennsylvania
Jazz musicians from New Jersey
20th-century double-bassists
American male jazz musicians
Kenny Clarke/Francy Boland Big Band members
20th-century American male musicians